Brujería is the Spanish term for witchcraft.

Brujería may also refer to:

 Brujeria (band), death metal band
 "Brujería" (Aja song)
 "Brujería" (Shakira song)
 "Brujería" (Son de Sol song), Spanish entry at the 2005 Eurovision Song Contest